Teraphis is a genus of beetles in the family Carabidae, containing the following species:

 Teraphis cavicola Moore, 1977
 Teraphis crenulata (Sloane, 1923)
 Teraphis elongata Castelnau, 1867
 Teraphis helmsi (Sloane, 1890)
 Teraphis melbournensis Castelnau, 1867
 Teraphis tasmanica (Sloane, 1920)

References

Psydrinae
Taxa named by François-Louis Laporte, comte de Castelnau